Irakleia (before 1915: Μπρούμα - Brouma) is a village in the municipality of Ancient Olympia, Elis, Greece. Its population in 2011 was 272. Irakleia is located 3 km northwest of Pelopio, 6 km southeast of Karatoula, 7 km northwest of Olympia and 15 km northeast of Pyrgos.

Population

History
Irakleia was named after Heracleia, a town of the ancient Eleans, located about 50 stadia (9 km) from Olympia and near the river Kytheros. It had a spring and a sanctuary of the Ionides: the nymphs Calliphaea, Synallasia, Pegaea and Iasis. It was believed that the spring water cured all sorts of aches and pains.

See also

List of settlements in Elis

References

External links
Heraklia at the GTP Travel Pages

Geography of ancient Elis
Cities in ancient Peloponnese
Populated places in Elis